is small seafood, meat or seaweed that has been simmered in soy sauce and mirin. As a flavorful accompaniment to plain rice, tsukudani is made salty enough to not go bad, allowing high osmotic pressure to preserve the ingredients from microbial spoilage in Japan's humid climate. Its name originates from Tsukudajima, the island (in present-day Chūō, Tokyo) where it was first made in the Edo period. Many kinds of tsukudani are sold. Traditionally-made tsukudani is preservable and has been favored as a storable side dish in Japanese kitchens since the Edo period.

Tsukudani can be made with kombu or wakame seaweeds, and is often made to reuse ingredients from making dashi that would otherwise be discarded. It is usually eaten with steamed rice as a flavoring agent, since the flavor is very intense (approximately 1 tbsp for one bowl of rice). Finished tsukudani is served chilled from the refrigerator, where it takes on a gelatinous texture.

Local variations

 , made with little neck clam – Chiba Prefecture
 , made with sand lance – Hyōgo Prefecture
 , made with locusts – Fukushima Prefecture and Nagano Prefecture
 , made with stonefly and caddisfly larvae – Ina, Nagano

See also

References

Japanese cuisine
Seafood dishes